Pangkor Island is an island in Manjung District, Perak, Malaysia. It has a population of approximately 25,000. Nearby islands include Pangkor Laut Island, Giam Island, Mentagor Island, Simpan Island, and Tukun Terindak Island. The major industries of the island are tourism and fishing.

Geography
The interior of the island is forested and is home to 65 reptile species, 17 amphibian species, and 82 total herpetofaunal species.

History 

Historically, Pangkor was a refuge for local fishers, merchants and pirates. In the 17th century, the Dutch built a fort to control the Perak tin trade, known as the Dutch Fort. In 1874, it was the location of a historical treaty between the British government and a contender for the Perak throne (the Pangkor Treaty), which began the British colonial domination of the Malay Peninsula. The old British name for the Pangkor Island group was the Dindings.

Batu Gong is a petroglyph (rock carving) of an unknown age located on a headland at Pantai Pasir Bogak depicting a gong, first mentioned by G. De.

In 2003, Marina Island (an artificial island) was developed by the Marina Island Group of companies and began operation in 2010, with private investment of RM250 million by 2013. The integrated mixed development resort island consists of waterfront residential properties, a new jetty (Marina Island Jetty), a private commercial marina called Pangkor Marina Malaysia, service apartments, hotels and shop offices. The jetty has a ferry service that connects to the island.

2004-2014 was a period of high growth and development for the island and the surrounding district. In 2006, a biotechnology centre, a joint venture of Global Hi-Q Malaysia S/B and Hi-Q Bio-Tech International (Taiwan) Ltd began operations with initial investments of 100 million ringgit (US$30 million). Their operations include fish farming and aquaculture, and the first harvest was in 2009.

Tourism
Following the Federal Government's move to grant the island duty-free status effective 1 January 2020, the island recorded a 40 percent increase in visitors. Manjung Municipal Council (MPM) recorded 1.42 million visitors to the island compared to 1.03 million in 2017.

Transport

Pangkor Island is a three-hour drive from Kuala Lumpur and is accessible through the Ipoh–Lumut 4-lane dual carriage highway and the West Coast Expressway. Buses frequently arrive at the main jetty in Lumut. No bridges connect the island to the mainland because a policy aimed to control the number of vehicles on the island to prevent road congestion.

Public ferries depart from Lumut to Pangkor Island from the old Lumut jetty. The ferry service stops at two jetties at the east side of Pangkor Island, Sungai Pinang Kecil; SPK jetty; and Pangkor Town Jetty.

There's new Ferry company from mainland to the Island which shorter path compare to regular ferry. It starts from Marina Bay. The fare little higher compare to regular ferry. Regular ferry from Lumut Jetty to Pangkor Island will take 30 to 40 minutes, while Marina Bay to Pangkor Island only take 15 to 20 minutes.

The island is served by Pangkor Airport through charter air service by Berjaya Air and scheduled airline service from Subang Airport by SKS Airways.

Notable places
The west coast of Pangkor is famous for its beaches, resorts and hotels for tourist accommodations. The famous beaches there include Pasir Bogak, Teluk Nipah and Coral Beach. The east coast of Pangkor is where all the residents live and where many of them work in the local foods and fisheries activities, including the dry fish factory, boat workshops, and a fish farm. Other attractions on the island include the Fu Ling Kong temple, the Sri Pathirakaliamman temple in Sungai Pinang Besar village; Batu Bersurat, Tiger Rock, the Dutch Fort (Kota Belanda), the tombs in Kampung Teluk Gedung and Tortoise Hill and Batu Gong.

Climate 
Pangkor Island is situated off Malaysia's west coast and experiences hot and humid weather all year round. The rainy season runs from April - October, and the dry season is from October - April.

Gallery

References

External links

 Pulau Pangkor Official Website
 Tourism Malaysia - Pangkor Island
 Official website

 

Islands of Perak
Manjung District
Islands of the Strait of Malacca